is a Japanese actor from Hyōgo Prefecture. 
He was born in Himeji and raised in Takasago. Rokkaku is the vocalist of Rokkaku Seiji Band. He dropped out of Gakushuin University.

Rokkaku became famous in Japan for his role as Mamoru Yonezawa in Aibou Series. He landed the lead role in AIBOU Series: Yonezawa Mamoru no Jikenbo spin-off film of AIBOU series.

Selected filmography

Film
 One Missed Call (2003)
 Hinokio (2005)
 Tokyo Tower: Mom and Me, and Sometimes Dad (2007) as Editor-in-chief
 AIBOU: The Movie (2008) as Mamoru Yonezawa
 AIBOU Series: Yonezawa Mamoru no Jikenbo (2009) as Mamoru Yonezawa
 AIBOU: The Movie II (2010) as Mamoru Yonezawa
 13 Assassins (2010) as Otake Mosuke
 Leonie (2010) as Postman
 Gekkō no Kamen (2012) as Morinoya Kinta
 Samurai Hustle (2014) as Imamura Seizaemon
 Partners: The Movie III (2014) as Mamoru Yonezawa
 Samurai Hustle Returns (2016) as Imamura Seizaemon
 Gintama (2017) as Char Aznable
 Under the Open Sky (2021) as Ryōsuke Matsumoto
 Wedding High (2022) as Daizō Nitta
 What to Do with the Dead Kaiju? (2022) as the Chief Cabinet Secretary
 Anime Supremacy! (2022) as Seki
 Convenience Story (2022), Nagumo
 Shikake-nin Fujieda Baian (2023)

Television
 Carnation (2012) as Megumi Matsuda
 AIBOU: Tokyo Detective Duo (2000–2017) as Mamoru Yonezawa
 Mare (2015) as Anzai Hayato
 Naotora: The Lady Warlord (2017) as Honda Masanobu
 Half Blue Sky (2018) as Mitsuru Saionj
 Ochoyan (2020) as Katagane Heihachi
 24 Japan (2020) as Banba Eiiji
 Lost Man Found (2022) as Arita
 Gannibal (2022), Kiyoshi Gotō
 Elpis (2022)

Culture program
 Rokkaku Seiji no Nomitetsu Honsen Nihontabi (2015–present)

References

External links

1962 births
Living people
Japanese male film actors
Japanese male television actors
Actors from Hyōgo Prefecture
20th-century Japanese male actors
21st-century Japanese male actors